Metal Heaven is an independent record label based in Altheim, Germany, established in 2004 as a sub-label of AOR Heaven. Its president is Georg Siegl.

Artists
Altaria
Audiovision
Bai Bang
Biss
Bloodbound
Blue Tears
Bulletrain
Burning Point
Chris Caffery
Civilization One
Cloudscape
Dark Sky
Deacon Street
Divinefire
Frontline
Fires of Babylon
Heartbreak Radio
Higher Ground
Legs Diamond
M.ill.ion
Millennium
Phenomena
Platitude!
Richard Andersson
Riot
S.I.N.
Saidian
Second Heat
Unchain
Winters Bane

See also
List of record labels

References
 Metal Archives.com Retrieved 24 October 2014

External links

German independent record labels
Record labels established in 2004
Heavy metal record labels